The National Front for the Liberation of Syria is a Syrian rebel alliance formed in southwestern Syria. It was formed by 11 rebel groups on 22 July 2017 as a "unified national, military, and political unit" in the region.

On 16 August 2017, Muhammad Sufian Hassan, commander of the Dawn of Unity Division, was appointed as the commander of the National Front for the Liberation of Syria.

Ideology
In its formation statement, the group supported the Syrian people's "right to self-determination" and rejected ideas that "contradict the interests of the revolution". It also rejected foreign involvement in the Syrian Civil War that are not consistent with the group's goals, and called on all opposition militias and political bodies in the region to unite. A number of the group's units were part of the Southern Front.

Member groups
The groups in italic were part of the Southern Front. See Southern Front former groups for additional information.

Supporters of Islam Front
Martyr Majid al-Khatib Brigade
Beit Sahem Hawks Brigade
Soldiers of Asima Battalion
Dawn of Unity Division
16th Special Forces Division
Golan Hawks Brigade
Desert Hawks Brigade
Unity of Houran Battalions Brigade
Sabtain Martyrs Brigade
Saladin Division
Shield of the Nation Brigade
Damascus Martyrs Brigade
Qadisiya Division
Revolutionary Commando Division
Freemen of the South Brigade
1st Commando Division
 Houran Plains Commandos Brigade
 Southern Commandos Brigade
 Ahmed Khalaf Brigade
 Saqr Hawran Brigade
Ahbab Omar Brigade
Thunder Brigade
Al-Musayfirah Martyrs Brigade
56th Infantry Brigade
Western Miliha Martyrs Brigade
al-Raya Brigade
1st Storm Brigade
Houran Brigade
Swords of Victory Brigade
Punishment Brigade
Lions of the Euphrates Gathering
Martyr Abu Mansur al-Amel Brigade
Kafar Shams Martyrs Brigade
Free Golan Brigade
Golan Commando Brigade
Special Tasks Brigade
Shield of the Revolution Brigade
Free Yarmouk Brigade
Supporters of Justice Union
Soldiers of the Levant Brigade
Al-Qumain Martyrs Brigade
Al-Omran Brigade
Revolutionary Commando Battalion
al-Luj Hawks Brigade
al-Naimi Commando Brigade
Lions of War Battalion
Al-Battar Brigade
Badia Martyrs Brigade
Khalid ibn al-Walid Battalion
Bani Sakhr Battalion
Anas ibn Malik Battalion
Martyr Abu al-Zahra
Martyr Ahmad al-Ahir
Othman Bin Affan
Lions of Clans
Al-Naser
Martyrs of al-Ghab
Martyrs of Baarbo
Men of God
Hawks of al-Twina
Omar ibn al-Khattab
Wolves of Shaabsho
Free Euphrates Brigades
Allahu Akbar Brigade
Revolutionary Council of Clans
Union of Tribal Council
Army of Tribes
Army of Conquerors
Kings of Land
South Detachments

See also

Alliance of Southern Forces
Revolutionary Army (Syria)

References

Anti-government factions of the Syrian civil war
Anti-ISIL factions in Syria
Free Syrian Army